The Peshtera Glacier (Bulgarian Lednik Peshtera) is a glacier on the Rozhen Peninsula, Livingston Island in the South Shetland Islands, Antarctica situated southwest of Ruen Icefall and north of Charity Glacier.

The head of the glacier is bounded by MacKay Peak (approx. 700 m) to the southwest and Tervel Peak to the east. It flows 2 km north-northwestward to terminate at the northeast extremity of Zagore Beach.  The feature is named after the Bulgarian town of Peshtera, in Pazardzhik Province.

Location
Bulgarian mapping in 2005 and 2009.

See also
 List of glaciers in the Antarctic
 Glaciology

Maps
 L.L. Ivanov et al. Antarctica: Livingston Island and Greenwich Island, South Shetland Islands. Scale 1:100000 topographic map. Sofia: Antarctic Place-names Commission of Bulgaria, 2005.
 L.L. Ivanov. Antarctica: Livingston Island and Greenwich, Robert, Snow and Smith Islands. Scale 1:120000 topographic map.  Troyan: Manfred Wörner Foundation, 2009.

References
 Peshtera Glacier SCAR Composite Antarctic Gazetteer
 Bulgarian Antarctic Gazetteer. Antarctic Place-names Commission. (details in Bulgarian, basic data in English)

External links
 Peshtera Glacier. Copernix satellite image

Glaciers of Livingston Island